Mecklenburg-Schwerin may refer to:

Duchy of Mecklenburg-Schwerin (1701–1815), a duchy of the Holy Roman Empire and the Confederation of the Rhine
Grand Duchy of Mecklenburg-Schwerin (1815–1918), a Grand Duchy of the German Confederation and the North German Confederation, that later became part of the German Empire
Free State of Mecklenburg-Schwerin (1918–1933), part of the Weimar Republic

de:Mecklenburg-Schwerin